The 2021 Men's Ice Hockey World Championships was the 84th such event hosted by the International Ice Hockey Federation. Due to the ongoing COVID-19 pandemic, only teams in the championship division participated in this year's tournament. The competition served as a qualification tournament for the top (only) division placements in the 2022 competition.

After all events were cancelled in 2020, all teams remained in their respective divisions. Singapore was scheduled to be the newest national team to participate and has been assigned to Division IV. On 18 November 2020, the IIHF announced that they had cancelled the tournaments for Divisions I, II, III and IV due to the COVID-19 pandemic. The Championship Division was held from 21 May to 6 June.

Championship (Top Division)

The tournament was held in Riga, Latvia from 21 May to 6 June 2021. Minsk, Belarus was originally scheduled to be a co-host, but in January 2021, the IIHF chose to remove Belarus as the host, due to security concerns.

Division I

Group A
The tournament was scheduled to be held in Ljubljana, Slovenia from 9 to 15 May 2021.

Group B
The tournament was scheduled to be held in Katowice, Poland from 26 April to 2 May 2021.

Division II

Group A
The tournament was scheduled to be held in Beijing, China from 10 to 16 April 2021.

Group B
The tournament was scheduled to be held in Reykjavík, Iceland from 18 to 24 April 2021.

Division III

Group A
The tournament was scheduled to be held in Kockelscheuer, Luxembourg from 18 to 24 April 2021.

Group B
The tournament was scheduled to be held in Cape Town, South Africa from 19 to 25 April 2021.

Division IV

The tournament was scheduled to be held in Bishkek, Kyrgyzstan from 3 to 5 March 2021.

References

External links
IIHF Official Website

 
World Ice Hockey Championships, Men's
IIHF Men's World Ice Hockey Championships